Tantulius is a monotypic moth genus of the family Erebidae. Its only species, Tantulius belli, is known from southern India. Both the genus and the species were first described by Michael Fibiger in 2010.

The wingspan is about 8 mm. The head, patagia, anterior part of the tegulae, prothorax, basal part of the costa, costal part of the medial area and fringes are blackish brown. The costal medial area is quadrangular. The forewing is short and relatively broad. The ground colour is yellow, while the terminal area is brown, suffused with a few black scales. The antemedial and postmedial line is well marked, narrow and light brown. The terminal line is indistinct and indicated by a few brown interneural dots. The hindwing is grey, without a discal spot. The underside of the forewing is light brown, while the underside of the hindwing is light grey.

References

Micronoctuini
Moths described in 2010
Monotypic moth genera